Peter Van Wambeke (born 19 April 1963) is a Belgian former football player and manager who played as a midfielder.

References

1963 births
Living people
Belgian footballers
Association football midfielders
Belgian Pro League players
K.F.C. Eendracht Zele players
K. Sint-Niklase S.K.E. players
K. Boom F.C. players
S.C. Eendracht Aalst players
K.S.V. Waregem players
Belgian football managers
K.S.V. Roeselare managers
S.K. Beveren managers
K.R.C. Gent managers